Marcelo Demoliner and Santiago González defeated Ariel Behar and Gonzalo Escobar in the final, 4–6, 6–3, [10–8], to win the doubles tennis title at the 2021 Stuttgart Open. It was their second title as a team, their first in three years. Behar and Escobar were contesting for their third title of the season. 

John Peers and Bruno Soares were the defending champions from when the tournament was last held in 2019, but Peers chose not to participate. Soares played alongside Jamie Murray but lost in the first round to Demoliner and González

Seeds

Draw

Draw

External Links
Main Draw

MercedesCup - Doubles
Doubles 2021